Mark Wynter (born Terence Sidney Lewis; 29 January 1943) is an English singer and actor, who had four Top 20 singles in the 1960s, including "Venus in Blue Jeans" and "Go Away Little Girl". He enjoyed a lengthy career from 1960 to 1968 as a pop singer and teen idol, and developed later into an actor in film, musicals and plays.

Career
With his early musical career on a proper footing, Terry Lewis decided to change his name to lessen the confusion with the American comedian, Jerry Lewis.

He was entered as one of the contenders for the UK's place in the Eurovision Song Contest in 1961, with "Dream Girl", but finished fourth behind The Allisons.

His cover version of the American hit by Jimmy Clanton, "Venus in Blue Jeans" (1962), was his biggest success. Although he recorded a number of singles for the Decca and Pye labels in the UK, he made few albums. Some recorded material came to light in 2004 when Wynter discovered old tapes.

On 8 April 1968 Wynter escaped from a burning Boeing 707 aircraft, BOAC Flight 712, upon which he had been a passenger, and which had exploded shortly after landing back at Heathrow Airport following a fire in its number 2 engine, killing five people, including stewardess  Barbara Jane Harrison, who was posthumously awarded the George Cross.

Wynter played the leading role in Conduct Unbecoming for more than a year at the Queen's Theatre in London, and for six months in Australia. He appeared with Julia McKenzie in On the Twentieth Century, and in Charley's Aunt. He also starred in Side By Side By Sondheim in Toronto, Chichester, and on the UK tour. In the 1982 Chichester Festival season he acted in several plays including On The Rocks and Henry V, and also sang in Valmouth. His other work in musicals during the 1980s included the role of the King in a revival of The King and I, the title roles in Hans Andersen and Barnum, the 1986 revival of Charlie Girl with Cyd Charisse and Paul Nicholas in London, and the part of Robert Browning in Robert and Elizabeth. During the 1990s Wynter spent two years in Cats, and was also seen as the Phantom and M. Andre in The Phantom of the Opera, and starred as Vittorio opposite Bonnie Langford in the 1998 West End revival of Sweet Charity. He has appeared frequently in the rest of the UK and portrayed Emile de Becque in a UK national tour of South Pacific. In 1994 he created the role of Van Helsing in the studio recording of the opera/musical "Nosferatu" by Bernard J. Taylor.

In 1981 he succeeded Peter Davison as the presenter of the children's television series Once Upon a Time. During the early 1990s he presented daytime shows on BBC Radio 2, as well as documentaries such as "Happy Times", a programme about the American entertainer Danny Kaye, which was nominated for a New York radio award.

Wynter was still working actively and successfully in theatre throughout the English speaking world well into the 1990s. Although his Decca singles output is scattered in the CD catalogue, in 2000 Castle Communications released Go Away Little Girl: The Pye Anthology, a double album compiling his complete output for the label. In 2007, Wynter toured the UK in a number of plays and musicals.

In 2017, Wynter went on a UK tour with The Solid Gold Rock'n'Roll Show, which also featured Eden Kane, Marty Wilde and Mike Berry. A 2021 tour is currently scheduled.

Personal life 
Wynter now lives in Sussex, and tours in plays for producer Bill Kenwright, pop tours for The Flying Music Company. A triple CD of his back catalogue was issued in 2017. He is married to Emma, and has three children.

Singles
1960: "Image of a Girl" / "Glory of Love" (UK #11)
1960: "Kickin' Up the Leaves" (Bart) / "That's What I Thought" (UK #24)
1961: "Dream Girl" / "Two Little Girls" (UK #27)
1961: "Exclusively Yours" / "Warm and Willing" (UK #32)
1961: "Girl for Ev'ry Day" / "The Best Time for Love"
1962: "Heaven's Plan" / "In Your Heart"
1962: "Angel Talk" / "I Love Her Still"
1962: "Venus in Blue Jeans" (Greenfield/Keller) / "Please Come Back to Me" (UK #4)
1962: "Go Away Little Girl" / "That Kinda Talk" (UK #6)
1963: "Aladdin's Lamp" / "It Can Happen Any Day"
1963: "Shy Girl" / "Because of You" (UK #28)
1963: "Running to You" / "Don't Cry"
1963: "It's Almost Tomorrow" / "Music to Midnight" (UK #12)
1964: "The Boy You're Kissin'" / "I Learned a Lot from You"
1964: "Only You (And You Alone)" / "It's Love You Want" (Wynter) (UK #38)
1964: "Answer Me" / "I Wish You Everything"
1964: "Love Hurts" / "Can't Help Forgiving You" (DeShannon/Sheeley)
1964: "Forever and a Day" / "And I Love Her"
1965: "Can I Get to Know You Better" / "Am I Living a Dream"  (Wynter)
1965: "Someday You'll Want Me to Want You" / "Here Comes"

Filmography

See also
List of artists who reached number one on the Australian singles chart

References

External links
Official website
[ Mark Wynter biography] at Allmusic website

1943 births
Living people
English male singers
People from Woking
Pye Records artists
Musicians from Surrey
20th-century English male actors
20th-century English singers
Survivors of aviation accidents or incidents
English male film actors
English male stage actors
20th-century British male singers